Stefan Schicker is a former Saxon cross-country skier who competed in the early 1980s. He earned a bronze medal in the 4 ×  10 km relay at the 1982 FIS Nordic World Ski Championships in Oslo (Tied with Finland). He started for the SG Dynamo Klingenthal / Sportvereinigung (SV) Dynamo.

References

External links
World Championship results 

Year of birth missing (living people)
Living people
German male cross-country skiers
FIS Nordic World Ski Championships medalists in cross-country skiing
Sportspeople from Saxony